The 1984 United States Senate election in Nebraska was held on November 6, 1984. Incumbent Democratic U.S. Senator J. James Exon won re-election to a second term.

Candidates

Democratic
  J. James Exon, incumbent Senator

Republican
  Nancy Hoch, businesswoman
 John DeCamp, State Senator

Results

See also 
  United States Senate elections, 1984

References 

Nebraska
1984
1984 Nebraska elections